Julius Thomson (14 June 1888 – 16 July 1960) was a German fencer. He competed at the 1912 and 1928 Summer Olympics. He was the twin brother of Hans Thomson, who also competed for Germany at the Olympics in fencing.

References

External links
 

1888 births
1960 deaths
German male fencers
Olympic fencers of Germany
Fencers at the 1912 Summer Olympics
Fencers at the 1928 Summer Olympics
German twins
Sportspeople from Offenbach am Main
Twin sportspeople
20th-century German people